Johann Jakob Sulzer (23 December 1821 – 27 June 1897) was a Swiss politician, mayor of Winterthur (1858–1873) and President of the Swiss Council of States (1876).

He was the son of Johann Jakob Sulzer senior, founder of Sulzer (manufacturer).

External links 

1821 births
1897 deaths
Members of the Council of States (Switzerland)
Presidents of the Council of States (Switzerland)